Corethrella is a genus of midges that are classified in the family Corethrellidae.

Systematics
The genus currently comprises 120 extant and 10 fossil species.

Extant species

Subgenus Corethrella Coquillett, 1902 

 Corethrella aereus Wang & Yu, 2015
 Corethrella alba Borkent, 2008
 Corethrella albicoxa Borkent, 2008
 Corethrella alticola Lane, 1939
 Corethrella amabilis Borkent, 2008
 Corethrella amazonica Lane, 1939
 Corethrella ananacola Dyar, 1926
 Corethrella anniae Borkent, 2008
 Corethrella appendiculata Grabham, 1906
 Corethrella aridicola Borkent, 2008
 Corethrella atricornis Borkent, 2008
 Corethrella aurita Borkent, 2008
 Corethrella badia Borkent, 2008
 Corethrella belkini Borkent, 2008
 Corethrella bicincta Borkent, Grafe & Miyagi, 2012
 Corethrella bicolor Borkent, 2008
 Corethrella bipigmenta Borkent & Grafe, 2012
 Corethrella blanda Dyar, 1928
 Corethrella blandafemur Borkent, 2008
 Corethrella blantoni Borkent, 2008
 Corethrella borkenti Amaral, Pinho, 2015
 Corethrella brakeleyi (Coquillett, 1902)
 Corethrella brandiae Borkent, 2008
 Corethrella brevivena Borkent, 2008
 Corethrella briannae Borkent, 2008
 Corethrella brunnea Borkent, 2012
 Corethrella buettikeri Cranston, 1980
Corethrella cabocla Feijó, Belchior, Marialva & Pessoa, 2021
 Corethrella calathicola Edwards, 1930
 Corethrella cambirela Amaral, Mariano & Pinho, 2019
 Corethrella canningsi Borkent, 2008
 Corethrella carariensis Borkent, 2008
 Corethrella cardosoi Lane, 1942
 Corethrella caribbeana Borkent, 2008
 Corethrella collessi Borkent, 2008
 Corethrella colombiana Borkent, 2008
 Corethrella condita Borkent, 2008
 Corethrella contraria Borkent, 2008
 Corethrella curta Borkent, 2008
 Corethrella davisi Shannon & Del Ponte, 1928
 Corethrella dehuai Wang & Yu, 2015
 Corethrella dicosimoae Borkent, 2008
 Corethrella douglasi Borkent, 2008
 Corethrella drakensbergensis Borkent, 2008
 Corethrella edwardsi Lane, 1942
 Corethrella evenhuisi Borkent, 2008
 Corethrella feipengi Yu, Huang & Zhang, 2013
 Corethrella flavitibia Lane, 1939
 Corethrella fulva Lane, 1939
 Corethrella fuscipalpis Borkent, 2008
 Corethrella fusciradialis Borkent, 2008
 Corethrella gilva Borkent & Grafe, 2012
 Corethrella globosa Borkent, 2008
 Corethrella gloma Borkent, 2008
 Corethrella grandipalpis Borkent, 2008
 Corethrella guadeloupensis Borkent, 2008
 Corethrella harrisoni Freeman, 1962
 Corethrella hirta Borkent, 2008
 Corethrella hispaniolensis Borkent, 2008
Corethrella ielemdei Feijó, Ramires, Lima & Pessoa, 2021
 Corethrella inca Lane, 1939
 Corethrella incompta Borkent, 2008
 Corethrella inepta Annandale, 1911
 Corethrella infuscata Lane, 1939
 Corethrella inornata Borkent, 2008
 Corethrella jenningsi Lane, 1942
 Corethrella kerrvillensis (Stone, 1965)
 Corethrella kipferi Dorff, Borkent and Curler, 2022
 Corethrella lepida Borkent, 2008
 Corethrella librata Belkin, Heinemann & Page, 1970
 Corethrella longituba Belkin, Heinemann & Page, 1970
 Corethrella lopesi Lane, 1942
 Corethrella lutea Borkent & Grafe, 2012
 Corethrella manaosensis (Lane & Cerqueira, 1958)
 Corethrella marksae Colless, 1986
 Corethrella mckeeveri Colless, 1994
 Corethrella melanica Lane & Aitken, 1956
Corethrella menini Feijó, Picelli, Ríos-Velásquez & Pessoa, 2021
 Corethrella mitra Borkent & Grafe, 2012
 Corethrella munteantaroku Amaral, Mariano & Pinho, 2019
 Corethrella nanoantennalis Borkent & Grafe, 2012
 Corethrella nippon Miyagi, 1980
 Corethrella oppositophila Kvifte & Bernal, 2018
 Corethrella orthicola Borkent, 2008
 Corethrella pallida Lane, 1942
 Corethrella pallidula Bugledich, 1999
 Corethrella pallitarsis Edwards, 1930
 Corethrella pauciseta Borkent, 2008
 Corethrella peruviana Lane, 1939
 Corethrella picticollis Edwards, 1930
 Corethrella pillosa Lane, 1939
 Corethrella procera Borkent, 2008
 Corethrella puella Shannon & Ponte, 1928
 Corethrella quadrivittata Shannon & Ponte, 1928
 Corethrella ramentum Borkent, 2008
 Corethrella ranapungens Borkent, 2008
 Corethrella redacta Borkent, 2008
 Corethrella remiantennalis Borkent, 2008
 Corethrella rotunda Borkent, 2008
 Corethrella selvicola Lane, 1939
 Corethrella solomonis Belkin, 1962
 Corethrella squamifemora Borkent, 2008
Corethrella stenostyla Amaral, Bello-González & Pinho, 2021
 Corethrella tarsata Lane, 1942
 Corethrella tigrina Borkent & Grafe, 2012
 Corethrella towadensis Okada & Hara, 1962
 Corethrella travassosi Lane, 1942
 Corethrella truncata Borkent, 2008
 Corethrella ugandensis Borkent, 2008
 Corethrella unisetosa Borkent, 2008
 Corethrella unizona Borkent & Grafe, 2012
 Corethrella urumense Miyagi, 1980
 Corethrella varia Borkent, 2008
 Corethrella vittata Lane, 1939
 Corethrella whartoni Vargas, 1952
 Corethrella wirthi Stone, 1968
 Corethrella xokleng Amaral, Mariano & Pinho, 2019
 Corethrella yanomami Amaral, Mariano & Pinho, 2019
 Corethrella yucuman Caldart & Pinho, 2016

Subgenus Notocorethrella Belkin, 1968 

 Corethrella novaezealandiae Tonnoir, 1927

Nomina dubia 

 Corethrella barrettoi Lane, 1942
 Corethrella japonica (Komyo, 1954)
 Corethrella maculata Lane, 1939
 Corethrella shannoni Lane, 1939
 Corethrella stonei Lane, 1942
 Corethrella striata Lane, 1942
 Corethrella whitmani Lane, 1942

Fossil species

Subgenus Corethrella Coquillett, 1902 

 Corethrella andersoni Poinar & Szadziewski, 2007
 Corethrella baltica Borkent, 2008
 Corethrella dominicana Borkent, 2008
 Corethrella miocaenica Szadziewski, Krzeminski and Kutscher, 1994
 Corethrella nudistyla Borkent and Szadziewski, 1992
 Corethrella patula Baranov & Kvifte, 2019
 Corethrella prisca Borkent & Szadziewski, 1992
 Corethrella rovnoensis Baranov & Kvifte, 2016
 Corethrella sontagae Baranov & Kvifte, 2016

Subgenus Fossicorethrella Szadziewski, 1995 

 Corethrella cretacea Szadziewski, 1995

References

Culicoidea genera
Taxa named by Daniel William Coquillett